Maciej Górski (27 January 1944 – 5 January 2020) was a Polish diarist and politician.

Life 
Górski was born in Warsaw. In 1966, he graduated from law at the University of Warsaw. He worked for Życie Warszawy and the Polish news agency and publishing house Interpress. He was correspondent in Stockholm, Rome, and the Vatican City. He was Vice Minister for Defence 2003–2005, and president Aleksander Kwaśniewski advisor for European affairs. Ambassador to Italy (1996–2001) and Greece (2005–2006).

In 1997, he received Knight Grand Cross with Collar of the Order of Merit of the Italian Republic.

Górski is buried at the Powązki Military Cemetery.

References

1944 births
2020 deaths
Ambassadors of Poland to Greece
Ambassadors of Poland to Italy
Burials at Powązki Military Cemetery
Knights Grand Cross with Collar of the Order of Merit of the Italian Republic
Politicians from Warsaw
Polish reporters and correspondents
University of Warsaw alumni
Diplomats from Warsaw